The 2002 Eurocard German Open was a women's tennis event that was played from 6 May to 12 May 2002. It was one of two Tier I events that took place on red clay in the build-up to the second Grand Slam of the year, the French Open. It was played at the Rot-Weiss Tennis Club in the German capital of Berlin. The tournaments offered a total prize fund of US$1,224,000 across all rounds. Fifth-seeded Justine Henin won the singles title and earned $182,000 first-prize money..

Finals

Singles

 Justine Henin defeated  Serena Williams, 6–2, 1–6, 7–6(7–5)
It was Justine Henin's 1st Tier I title of the year.

Doubles

 Elena Dementieva /  Janette Husárová defeated  Daniela Hantuchová /  Arantxa Sánchez, 0–6, 7–6(7–3), 6–2

Prize money

External links
 ITF tournament edition details
 Tournament draws

Qatar Telecom German Open
Berlin
WTA German Open
May 2002 sports events in Europe